Ayushman Bharat Pradhan Mantri Jan Arogya Yojana (PM-JAY) (PM-JAY , Ayushman Bharat PM-JAY ; also referred to as Ayushman Bharat National Health Protection Scheme or NHPS) is a national public health insurance fund of the Government of India that aims to provide free access to health insurance coverage for low income earners in the country. Roughly, the bottom 50% of the country qualifies for this scheme.  People using the program access their own primary care services from a family doctor. When anyone needs additional care, then PM-JAY provides free secondary health care for those needing specialist treatment and tertiary health care for those requiring hospitalization.

The programme is part of the Indian government's National Health Policy and is means-tested. It was launched in September 2018 by the Ministry of Health and Family Welfare. That ministry later established the National Health Authority as an organization to administer the program. It is a centrally sponsored scheme and is jointly funded by both the union government and the states. By offering services to 50 crore (500 million) people it is the world's largest government sponsored healthcare program. The program is a means-tested as its users are people with low income in India.

History
In 2017 an Indian version of the Global Burden of Disease Study reported major diseases and risk factors from 1990 to 2016 for every state in India. This study brought a lot of interest in government health policy because it identified major health challenges which the government could address. In 2018 the Indian government described that every year, more than six crores Indians were pushed into poverty because of out of pocket medical expenses. Despite various available regional and national programs for healthcare in India, there was much more to be done. The Indian government first announced the Ayushman Bharat Yojana as a universal health care plan in February 2018 in the 2018 Union budget of India. The Union Council of Ministers approved it in March. In his 2018 Independence Day speech Prime Minister Narendra Modi announced that India would have a major national health program later that year on 25 September, also commemorating the birthday of Pandit Deendayal Upadhyaya.

In June 2018 the applications opened for hospitals through an "empanelment process". In July 2018, the Ayushman Bharat Yojana recommended that people access benefits through Aadhaar, but also said that there was a process for people to access without that identity card. AB PM-JAY was first launched on 23 September 2018 at Ranchi, Jharkhand. By 26 December 2020 the scheme was extended to the Union Territories of Jammu Kashmir and Ladakh. The program has been called "ambitious".

Features 

Implementation

Reach 
Participation by states and union territories

India's 28 states and 8 union territories each make their own choice about whether to participate in Ayushman Bharat Yojana. In February 2018 when the program was announced 20 states committed to join. In September 2018 shortly after launch some states and territories declined to participate in the program. Maharashtra and Tamil Nadu initially declined to join because they each had their own state healthcare programmes. Those programs, Mahatma Jyotiba Phule Jan Arogya Yojana and the programme for Tamil Nadu, were already functioning well. These states later both joined Ayushman Bharat Yojana with special exceptions to make it part of their existing infrastructure. In a similar way, Kerala, despite having its own health program agreed to begin using Ayushman Bharat Yojana from November 2019. West Bengal initially joined the program but then opted out in favor of establishing their own regional health programme. Telangana did the same. By January 2020 Odisha had not joined the scheme. In March 2020 Delhi announced that it would join the program.

Participation by local people

In May 2020 Prime Minister Narendra Modi said in his radio show Mann Ki Baat that the Ayushman Bharat scheme had recently benefited more than one crore people. By May 2020, the scheme had provided more than 1 crore treatments with a value of  crore. The number of public and private hospitals empanelled nationwide stands at 24,432. The Ayushman Bharat Yojana programme announced a special collaboration with the Employees' State Insurance programme in November 2019. From June 2020, the program had entered a pilot to cover 120,000 workers with that insurance at 15 hospitals.

Challenges
When Ayushman Bharat Yojana began there were questions of how to reconcile its plans with other existing health development recommendations, such as from NITI Aayog. A major challenge of implementing a national health care scheme would be starting with infrastructure in need of development to be part of a modern national system. While Ayushman Bharat Yojana seeks to provide excellent healthcare, India still has some basic healthcare challenges including relatively few doctors, more cases of infectious disease, and a national budget with a comparatively low central government investment in health care. Some of the problems lay outside the Health Ministry such as urban development or transport. While many government hospitals have joined the program, many private corporate hospitals have not. The private hospitals report that they would be unable to offer their special services at the government low price, even with a government subsidy.

There has been misuse of the Ayushman Bharat scheme by private hospitals through submission of fake medical bills. Under the Scheme, surgeries have been claimed to be performed on persons who had been discharged long ago and dialysis has been shown as performed at hospitals not having kidney transplant facility. There are at least 697 fake cases in Uttarakhand State alone, where fine of  has been imposed on hospitals for frauds under the Scheme. Initial analysis of high-value claims under PMJAY has revealed that a relatively small number of districts and hospitals account for a high number of these, and some hint of an anti-women bias, with male patients getting more coverage. Despite all efforts to curb foul-play, the risk of unscrupulous private entities profiteering from gaming the system is clearly present in AB-PMJAY.

References

External links

Health programmes in India
Publicly funded health care
2018 introductions
Social security in India
2018 establishments in India
Government schemes in India